Erygia subapicalis is a moth of the family Erebidae. It was described from Wady Ferran in Arabia.

References

Moths described in 1870
Erygia
Moths of Asia